Negros Occidental's 6th congressional district is one of the six congressional districts of the Philippines in the province of Negros Occidental. It has been represented in the House of Representatives since 1987. The district consists of the area in southern Negros Occidental containing the cities of Kabankalan and Sipalay, and the municipalities of Candoni, Cauayan, Hinoba-an and Ilog. It is currently represented in the 19th Congress by Mercedes Alvarez of the Nationalist People's Coalition (NPC).

Representation history

Election results

2022

2019

2016

2013

2010

See also
Legislative districts of Negros Occidental

References

Congressional districts of the Philippines
Politics of Negros Occidental
1987 establishments in the Philippines
Congressional districts of Western Visayas
Constituencies established in 1987